Frankenstein (Sachs) station is a railway station in Oberschöna, Saxony, Germany. It is named after Frankenstein, which was the nearest settlement when the railway line was built and the station opened.

References

Railway stations in Saxony
Buildings and structures in Mittelsachsen
Railway stations in Germany opened in 1869